DeMond Winston is a retired professional American football player who played linebacker for the New Orleans Saints.

References

1968 births
American football linebackers
New Orleans Saints players
Vanderbilt Commodores football players
Living people